Below is a list of speakers of the National Assembly of Namibia. Hage Geingob was the chairman of the Constituent Assembly until March 1990.

References

Politics of Namibia
Namibia
Namibia